Bigg Boss 6 is a reality show and the sixth season of the Telugu version of the Indian reality television series Bigg Boss based on the Dutch series Big Brother and produced by Endemol Shine India (now merged with Banijay). The show was launched on 4 September 2022 on Star Maa and Disney+ Hotstar.

Production
On 26 May 2022, the makers of the show released a promo where Nagarjuna announced that commoners can participate in season 6. The auditions were done by the starmaa.startv.com website. The show organizers officially released a teaser using the show's logo on 4 August 2022. On 9 August 2022, a new teaser was released with Nagarjuna as a host and promo shoot directed by Prasanth Varma. On 19 August 2022, it was confirmed that the show would premiere on 4 September 2022 on Star Maa and Disney+ Hotstar.

24x7 streaming
The show stands out for the fact that it streamed day and night on Disney+ Hotstar and an hour-long episode every day on Star Maa. The episodes were shown on a 24-hour live stream, from Monday to Friday.

Housemates 
The participants in the order of appearance and entered in the house are:

Original entrants 

 Keerthi Bhat – Television actress. She is best known for her role as Bhanumathi in the Telugu TV series  Manasichi Choodu and Dr. Hima Karthik in Karthika Deepam (Telugu TV series).
 Sudeepa Pinky – Film and television actress. She is best known for her role as Pinky in the film Nuvvu Naaku Nachav (2001) Bommarillu and Revathy in the TV show Aa Okkati Adakku.
 Shrihan Shaik  –  YouTuber
 Neha Chowdary – Television presenter known for her appearance in Pro Kabaddi League, Indian Premier League and other sporting events
 Chalaki Chanti – Film and television actor. He is best known for his work in Jabardasth.
 Sri Satya – Television actress, model and YouTuber. She has appeared in shows such as Akka Chellelu and Trinayani.
 Arjun Kalyan – Film actor.
 Geetu Royal – Radio jockey, YouTuber and television actress. She has appeared in the comedy show Jabardasth.
 Abhinaya Shree – Film actress. She is known for her work in the films Arya (2004) Hangama and Paisalo Paramatma (2007).
 Marina Abraham – Television actress. She is popularly known for her role as Samantha in the drama series America Ammayi.
 Rohit Sahni –Television actor.
 Bala Aditya – Film and television actor. He is known for his performance in the films Anna (1994), Little Soldiers (1996) and 1940 Lo Oka Gramam (2010).
 Vasanthi Krishnan – Film actress. She is recognized for her work in the film Cauliflower (2021).
 Shani Salmon – Film actor. He is known for his work in the film Sye (2004).
 Inaya Sulthana – Film and voice actress.
 RJ Surya Narayana – Radio jockey, television actor and mimic. He is popular for his work in various radio shows of Red FM 93.5 and the TV show Ismart News of TV9.
 Faima Sheikh – Television actress. She is best known for her work in Jabardasth.
 Adi Reddy – YouTuber. He is known for producing videos reviewing the Bigg Boss show.
 Raj Shekar – Model.
 Arohi Rao – Television presenter and actress. She is known for her work in the TV show Ismart News of TV9.
 L. V. Revanth – Playback Singer, Television presenter, winner of Indian Idol 9, and runner of Big Boss Telugu Season 6. He is known for his songs Manohari, Telisiney Na Nuvvey and Oopiri Aaguthunnadey. Revanth has also participated in several singing-competition shows such as  Super Singer 5 and Indian Idol 9.

Related shows

Bigg Boss 6 Buzzz
Bigg Boss 6 Buzzz is an Indian Telugu-language television talk show about the reality television series Bigg Boss Telugu. The show premiered on 5 September 2022 on Star Maa Music and unaired portions of episodes are streamed on Disney+ Hotstar and aired on Star Maa Music.

BB Cafe
BB Cafe is a review-based show about the reality television series Bigg Boss Telugu. The host Ariyana Glory discusses all the topics of Bigg Boss Season 6 every Monday to Friday at 7:30 pm. The show premiered on 5 September 2022 on Star Maa Music. The host Shiva conducts the evictee interview show with the evicted contestants every Monday.

References 

Indian reality television series
2022 Indian television seasons
Bigg Boss (Telugu TV series) seasons